Enrique Liporace (born June 10, 1941) is an Argentine actor.

Life and work

Liporace began his career as an actor in 1963, when he was cast in La terraza, directed by period piece filmmaker Leopoldo Torre Nilsson. He earned extensive credits as a supporting actor in Argentine cinema, television and theatre in subsequent years, working with leading local directors such as Luis Saslavsky, Hugo del Carril, Lucas Demare and Manuel Antín. Liporace shared an ill-fated relationship with actress Soledad Silveyra during the late 1960s, though the couple never married.

Liporace's role as Basile, the compromised mining engineer in Adolfo Aristarain's Tiempo de revancha (1981) would become one of his best-known, and the following year, he starred in Aristarain's thriller, Últimos días de la víctima. He also returned to the theatre, and acted in Al vencedor, a military drama by Osvaldo Dragún, during the Argentine Open Theatre festival of the early 1980s.

The versatile actor played a transvestite man immersed in intrigue in Hebert Posse Amorim's 1985 critique of corporate control over broadcasting in Sin querer, queriendo (Accidentally on Purpose). A series of less notable roles followed, though Liporace remained busy in film and theatre alike. He appeared as populist President Juan Perón's calculating Information Minister, Raúl Apold, in Juan Carlos Desanzo's Eva Perón (1996), and as the gruff, corner café proprietor given to hiring illegal immigrants in Bolivia (2001).

Liporace's later roles include that of a nostalgic, minor-party politician in Fernando Musa's Chiche bombón (2004), and of a reprise of his earlier role as a transvestite in Daniel Ritto's Plástico cruel (2005). These roles never brought the recognition Lioprace sought, however, and the aging actor instead found success in the theatre, when in 2009 he was cast in Hernán Casciari's play, Más respeto que soy tu madre (More Respect - I'm Your Mother). The play, a slice-of-life tale set during the Argentine economic crisis of 2002, cast Liporace opposite famed female impersonator Antonio Gasalla as the Bertottis, and drew a combined audience of half a million in its first 540 shows in Buenos Aires.

Selected filmography and theatre roles

References

1941 births
Living people
Argentine people of Italian descent
Argentine male actors
Argentine male stage actors